Externalization is efforts by wealthy, developed countries to prevent asylum seekers and other migrants from reaching their borders, often by enlisting third countries or private entities. Externalization is used by Australia, Canada, the United States, the European Union and the United Kingdom. Although less visible than physical barriers at international borders, externalization controls or restrict mobility in ways that are out of sight and far from the country's border. Examples include visa restrictions, sanctions for carriers who transport asylum seekers, and agreements with source and transit countries. Consequences often include increased irregular migration, human smuggling, and border deaths.

History
According to sociologist David Scott FitzGerald, "Measures to keep people from reaching sanctuary are as old as the asylum tradition itself." The main technologies of externalization were developed in the 1930s and 1940s in order to reduce the number of Jewish refugees arriving in the Americas and Mandatory Palestine. After World War II, many countries were ashamed of their failure to protect Jewish refugees, and adopted the norm of non-refoulement, which effectively prevented the rejection of refugees to countries where they would face persecution. Since 1994, the number of refugees resettled has consistently been below 1 percent of those eligible. Most refugees can only hope to receive asylum in a Global North country by physically traveling there and applying for asylum. FitzGerald argues that any territorial system of asylum creates an incentive to reduce the number of claimants through externalization. State practices of externalization by developed countries proliferated through the 1980s, 1990s, and 2000s.

Motivation
FitzGerald argues that "Keeping refugees at a distance is a public relations scheme to render them invisible so their plight can be ignored", and also attempts to evade legally binding human rights obligations. Externalization policies are often "specifically designed to avoid any direct jurisdictional links to the sponsoring State, at whose behest controls are carried out". According to legal scholar Ioannis Kalpouzos, the desire to avoid migration and legal accountability has "led to an increasingly sophisticated set of practices the aim of which is to avoid, outsource, and distance responsibility, accountability, and liability". According to one estimate, asylum claims in nineteen countries were reduced by 17 percent because of externalization. In some countries, externalization combined with geographical isolation can reduce unauthorized arrivals to nearly zero, but these policies are much less effective in Europe due to the long land border and proximity to Turkey and North Africa. Legal scholars Thomas Gammeltoft-Hansen and Nikolas Tan argue that deterring asylum seekers "is not sustainable in the long term, or even perhaps in the medium term" because of increasing financial costs, lack of effectiveness, and legal challenges.

Effects
According to The Oxford Handbook of International Refugee Law, "Extraterritorial migration control represents a fundamental challenge to refugees’ ability to access asylum". FitzGerald describes the case of Alan Kurdi, a young Syrian refugee who drowned while trying to reach Europe, as a case of the externalization system "working as designed". Instead of the common term irregular, some sources use the term irregularized migration to indicate the outcome of state policies that prevent other forms of entry. Professor  argues that denial of access to the global mobility infrastructure has led to the emergence of a shadow mobility infrastructure. "If we take border deaths as a measure of the incidence of the reliance on this shadow mobility infrastructure, the conclusion would be that human smuggling has increased consistently with increased control over the access to the global mobility infrastructure." Several studies have found that "perhaps the key single determinant of smuggling at sea, and the deaths that result from dangerous transport, especially across the Mediterranean, is the closing down of legal options for air travel and entry to Europe" and visa restrictions.

FitzGerald states that "smugglers can be blamed for deaths and abuses rather than the government policies that leave refugees seeking safety with few choices"; a tactic used by governments since Jews were trying to escape from Europe during World War II. In the Mediterranean, expansion of externalization did not end irregular migration but simply redirected it to alternate routes and more dangerous pathways. The Australian researchers Antje Missbach and Melissa Phillips state that "the growing prevalence of irregular migration is a direct result of the imposition of restrictions on legal migration through barriers, walls, security, and surveillance measures and deterrents".

Empirical studies in several countries have found that anti-migration policies increase the number of people residing irregularly. This is because the majority of people residing irregularly in many Global North countries arrived legally and overstayed their visa. Efforts to make border crossing more difficult may promote permanent settlement in place of earlier patterns of temporary migration.

Types

Visa restrictions and carrier sanctions

There is a strong correlation between visa restrictions and the number of refugees from a country; all of the world's ten largest producers of refugees are also among those with the strictest visa requirements. Because visa restrictions are applied to all countries whose nationals are usually recognized as refugees when they apply for asylum, FitzGerald states that "the main goal of the visa policies is not to restrict asylum seekers without valid claims, but to keep out people even if they are refugees".

Carrier sanctions impose penalties on transportation companies, such as passenger shipping and airlines, who carry unauthorized passengers without a valid visa. For people entitled to refugee protection who are unable to reach the destination country because of carrier sanctions, there are two possibilities: either they are denied refugee protection or embark on irregular migration, which carries the risk of death. According to researchers Theodore Baird and Thomas Spijkerboer, the visa and carrier sanctions regime could be abolished by insisting that all border control is done at the actual border, by state agents instead of private companies.

Marketing
Another form of externalization is marketing campaigns aimed at people who are considering irregular migration to discourage them. The United States is known for deceptive campaigns that mislead viewers as to their origin.

Interdiction of boats in international waters
Another form of externalization is the interception of boats in international waters to prevent them from reaching the destination country. The interception may be done by boats belonging to the country trying to control migration, in the form of maritime pushbacks, or by a third country, in which case they are pullbacks. Some international requirements require boat patrols by transit countries such as Morocco, which is of doubtful compliance with international human rights law. Intercepting people who try to leave a country can violate the right to leave any country, an internationally recognized human right. Although many states justify their interventions in humanitarian language, "offshore enforcement by any other name continues to be highly correlated with migrant deaths".

Human rights abuses that occur at sea are difficult and expensive for rights organizations or investigative journalists to monitor. In the mid-2010s, such efforts by NGOs in the Mediterranean led to a strong state crackdown; FitzGerald argues that "the fact that governments try so hard to avoid [monitoring] suggests that it is having some effect".

Agreements with third countries
Cooperation in externalization can be voluntary, but it often involves the coercive and neocolonial exploitation of power imbalance by Global North countries. A limitation on the success of agreements with source and transit countries to restrict is that these countries' values and interests do not necessarily coincide with the states trying to restrict access. For example, supporters of anti-immigration in the Global North typically want to limit all external immigration which limits the visa and immigration liberalization they are willing to offer to transit countries in exchange with their cooperation. Another obstacle is that many African and Latin American countries support freedom of movement for economic and political reasons and therefore complying with externalization policies can threaten their core interest. During the 2010s, externalization policies increasingly extended beyond neighboring countries to those farther away in Africa, the Middle East, and Central America. The reliance on externalization in migration control makes the destination countries dependent on the ability and willingness of other countries to cooperate.

FitzGerald argues that third-country agreements to constrain migration can have upsides for human rights protection. In general, in order to maintain the appearance of compliance with human rights, the most severe abuses must be avoided. He notes that "paying and training undemocratic buffer states to carry out abusive policies, are less effective when their secret violence becomes public knowledge" via exposure by journalists and human rights activists. The irregularization of migrants in transit countries leaves them more vulnerable to violence including extortion, robbery, rape, and murder; systematic human rights abuses have been reported. For example, Vasja Badalič states that "the EU supports, and relies on, Tunisia’s systemic violations of human rights in order to prevent irregular migrants from reaching the EU".

States that encourage human rights abuses abroad can be considered legally responsible or complicit in these abuses. An example of human rights violations occurring in third countries at the behest of immigration-restricting states is the establishment of camps at Manus Island and Nauru at Australia's request. Between 2015 and 2021, the EU paid the Libyan Coast Guard, an EU proxy force, $455 million. The European Union's partners in Libya have been documented engaging in human trafficking, slavery, torture, and other rights violations. A 2021 United Nations fact-finding report found that abuses against migrants in Libya by state and non-state actors, including the Libyan Coast Guard, are likely to amount to crimes against humanity. A 2021 investigation by The Outlaw Ocean Project and The New Yorker found that "The E.U. pays for almost every aspect of Libya's often lethal migrant detention system", including body bags. Libya's former justice minister, Salah Marghani, commented that the goal of Europe's externalization policies is to "Make Libya the disguise for their policies while the good humans of Europe say they are offering money to help make this hellish system safer." The anti-migration policies can have permanent effects on countries that cooperate in them. Risks include violence against migrants and increased instability and corruption.

Agreements to allow deportation of either their own nationals or nationals of other countries that pass through are strongly opposed by the citizens of many African countries. Despite strong pressure, the African Union opposes all involuntary returns. The Cotonou Agreement expired in early 2020 and has not been replaced because of differences between the European Union and the African Union on deportation. Many Africans oppose deportation because it is considered inhumane, threatens their access to remittances from family members living abroad, and exacerbates already high youth unemployment. There is little incentive to cooperate in readmission because remittances are higher than foreign and development aid combined for most low- and middle-income countries. The European Union's programs to reintegrate returned migrants have been mostly ineffective. A 2021 study found that formal and informal readmission agreements had little effect on the return rate.

Notes

References

Sources

Further reading

Human rights
Human migration